The Battle of Kealakekua Bay was a battle in 1779 in Hawaii, in which British explorer Captain James Cook was killed.

Background 

Captain Cook had previously visited Hawaii, which was then a Kingdom ruled by Native Hawaiians and returned in 1779, landing at Kealakekua Bay. His return coincided with Makahiki, a Hawaiian harvest festival of worship for the Polynesian god Lono. It has been argued that the Hawaiians regarded him as an incarnation of Lono, although this claim has been disputed. After a month's stay, Cook resumed his exploration of the North Pacific. However, the foremast of one of his ships broke, and the expedition returned to Kealakekua Bay for repairs. By then, the Makahiki had ended, and Cook's sudden return was unwelcome, and tensions rose between Cook's expedition and the inhabitants. A number of quarrels broke out between the Europeans and Hawaiians.

Battle 

On February 14, a group of Hawaiians seized one of Cook's small boats. Cook had previously dealt with thefts by taking hostages until the stolen articles were returned. However, he attempted to take Hawaiian king Kalaniʻōpuʻu as his hostage. The Hawaiians prevented this, and forced Cook's men to retreat to the beach, pursued by Hawaiian villagers. As Cook turned his back to help launch the boats, he was struck in the head and stabbed to death. Four of Cook's Marines were also killed, and two others wounded.

Aftermath 

The Hawaiians gave Cook funerary rituals similar to that of Hawaiian chiefs and elders. Cook's body was disembowelled, baked to facilitate removal of flesh, and the bones were carefully cleaned for preservation as religious icons. However, some of his remains were eventually returned to the British for a formal burial at sea following an appeal by the crew. Following Cook's death, Charles Clerke took over the expedition, which left Hawaii and eventually returned to Britain in 1780.

References 

Conflicts in 1779
Ancient Hawaii
Battles involving Great Britain
Battles involving Hawaii
1779 in Hawaii
History of Hawaii
James Cook